Beams is the debut studio album by Australian electronic dance music duo The Presets, released in September 2005 by record label Modular.

Reception 

The album received mixed to positive reviews. AllMusic called the album an "uneasy yet unforgettable combination of '80s gaudy pop flair and dark, propulsive rave beats". Pitchfork, on the other hand, gave it a low 3.7/10 rating, writing "the most frustrating thing about Beams is that Moyes and Hamilton both know better".

Track listing

Personnel 
The Presets
 Julian Hamilton – vocals, keyboards, mixing
 Kim Moyes – drums, keyboards, mixing

Additional musicians
 Felix Bloxsom – drums (tracks 1, 2, 4, 11)
 Phil Stucky – Trombone (tracks 2, 8, 12)
 Sam Dixon – bass and guitar (track 4)
 Kendal Cuneo – girl vocals (track 4)
 Veronique Serret – violin (track 12)
 Matthew Watson – violin (track 12)
 Zoe White – viola (track 12)
 Leah Zweck – viola (track 12)
 Rachael Maio – cello (track 12)
 Daniel Johns – acoustic guitar (track 12)
 Warwick Payne – guitar (track 12)

Technical
 ¥ Benjamin ~ DePriest
 Scott Horscroft – mixing
 Emerson Todd – mixing
 Mike Marsh – mastering
 Lyn Balzer – photography
 Anthony Perkins – photography
 Jonathan Zawada – art direction

Charts

Certifications

Release history

References

External links 
 

The Presets albums
2005 debut albums
Modular Recordings albums